Judge Fisher may refer to:

Clarkson Sherman Fisher (1921–1997), judge of the United States District Court for the District of New Jersey
D. Michael Fisher (born 1944), judge of the United States Court of Appeals for the Third Circuit
John Fisher (Delaware judge) (1771–1823), judge of the United States District Court for the District of Delaware
Joseph Jefferson Fisher (1910–2000), judge of the United States District Court for the Eastern District of Texas
Morton P. Fisher (1897–1965), judge of the United States Tax Court
Raymond C. Fisher (1939–2020), judge of the United States Court of Appeals for the Ninth Circuit

See also
Judge Fischer (disambiguation)
Justice Fisher (disambiguation)